Edward T. "Nick" Scharf (July 18, 1858 – May 11, 1937) was an American professional baseball player who played parts of two seasons for the Baltimore Orioles of the American Association in the early days of Major League Baseball.
He was born in Baltimore, Maryland and died in there at the age of 78.

External links

Baseball players from Baltimore
Baltimore Orioles (AA) players
Major League Baseball outfielders
1858 births
1937 deaths
Richmond Virginias players
Charlotte Hornets (baseball) players
Hartford Bluebirds players
Hanover Tigers players
19th-century baseball players